Tegostoma anaemicalis is a moth in the family Crambidae. It was described by George Hampson in 1900. It is found in Algeria.

References

Odontiini
Moths described in 1900
Moths of Africa
Taxa named by George Hampson